Night Lights is an album by American jazz saxophonist Gerry Mulligan featuring performances recorded in 1963 and first released on the Philips label.

Reception

The Allmusic site awarded the album 3 stars stating: "This is a rather relaxed recording featuring baritonist Gerry Mulligan and some of his top alumni... The emphasis is on ballads and nothing too innovative occurs, but the results are pleasing and laid-back".

Track listing
All compositions by Gerry Mulligan except as indicated
 "Night Lights" - 4:53
 "Morning of the Carnival" (Luiz Bonfá, Antônio Maria) - 5:27
 "In the Wee Small Hours of the Morning" (David Mann, Bob Hilliard) - 5:34
 "Prelude in E Minor" (Frédéric Chopin) - 4:11
 "Festival Minor" - 6:45
 "Tell Me When" - 4:06

Personnel
Gerry Mulligan - baritone saxophone, piano (track 1 only)
Art Farmer - flugelhorn
Bob Brookmeyer - valve trombone
Jim Hall - guitar
Bill Crow - bass
Dave Bailey - drums

References

Gerry Mulligan albums
1963 albums
Philips Records albums
Albums produced by Hal Mooney